John Gardener (fl. 1417) was an English Member of Parliament for Melcombe Regis in 1417.

References

14th-century births
15th-century deaths
English MPs 1417
Members of the Parliament of England (pre-1707) for Melcombe Regis